Alfrancis P. Chua (born January 17, 1966) is a Filipino sports executive and former basketball player and coach.  He is currently the team manager of Barangay Ginebra San Miguel and the sports director of San Miguel Corporation (SMC), overseeing the professional sports teams of the SMC group (Barangay Ginebra San Miguel, the San Miguel Beermen, the Magnolia Hotshots and the Petron Blaze Spikers).

Playing career
Letran Squires (NCAA)
UST Glowing Goldies (UAAP)
Philips Sardines (PABL)
Lucky Cement (Taiwan)

Coaching career

Philippine Basketball League (PBL)

Stag Pale Pilseners (1995–1996)
Chua was the head coach of the Stag Pale Pilseners in the Philippine Basketball League.  He achieved the grand slam during the franchise's debut 1995–1996 season, winning the Reinforced Conference, All-Filipino Cup and the Danny Floro Cup. After two seasons, Stag won four of the six tournaments held.

Tanduay Gold Rhum Masters (1997–1999)
The Stag franchise was renamed the Tanduay Gold Rhum Masters in the 1997–1998 season, where Chua piloted the team to another grand slam.  During the 1998–1999 season, the team emerged as champion during the 1st Yakult-PBL Centennial Cup and runner-up during the 2nd Yakult-PBL Centennial Cup. Shortly after, the franchise would leave the PBL and move to the Philippine Basketball Association (PBA), marking the return of Tanduay to the PBA.

Philippine Basketball Association (PBA)

Pop Cola Panthers (1998)
While coaching Tanduay in the PBL, he was also an assistant coach for Norman Black with the Pop Cola Panthers in the Philippine Basketball Association.

Tanduay Gold Rhum Masters (1999–2000)
Tanduay re-entered the PBA in 1999 PBA season with Chua as head coach. He led the team to a runner-up finish in the 1999 PBA All-Filipino Cup. In that season, he was selected to be the head coach of Rookies, Sophomores and Juniors in 1999 PBA All-Star Game.
 
Chua remained as head coach until the 2000 season. He was succeeded by Derrick Pumaren in the 2001 season, Tanduay's final season.

Sta. Lucia Realtors (2001–2007)
In 2001, Chua joined the Sta. Lucia Realtors as assistant coach under Norman Black. In 2003, Chua was appointed as head coach and led Sta. Lucia to two semifinal appearances during the season (2003 PBA All-Filipino Cup and 2003 PBA Reinforced Conference). In February 2007, Sta. Lucia announced that Chua was moved to the position of team consultant and assistant coach Boyet Fernandez appointed as the new head coach.

Barangay Ginebra San Miguel (2012–2013)
Chua returned to the PBA in January 2012, joining Barangay Ginebra San Miguel as team consultant. On January 1, 2013, Chua was appointed as head coach and led the team to a runner-up finish during the 2013 PBA Commissioner's Cup.

On July 25, 2013, San Miguel Corporation, owner of Barangay Ginebra San Miguel, announced that Chua was appointed as team manager and Ato Agustin would assume the position of interim coach for the 2013 PBA Governor's Cup.

Post-coaching career

Concurrent with Chua's assumption as team manager of Barangay Ginebra San Miguel, he was appointed as alternate PBA governor representing Ginebra San Miguel, Inc. (GSMI) in the PBA board. On July 17, 2015, The Philippine Star reported Chua's promotion to full-time PBA governor for GSMI and his appointment as sports director for San Miguel Corporation.

In June 2015, Chua was elected as president of the Basketball Coaches Association of the Philippines (BCAP), succeeding Chito Narvasa. He was succeeded by Louie Gonzales in June 2019.

In February 2018, Chua was appointed Special Assistant to the Rector for Sports Development of his high school alma mater, Colegio de San Juan de Letran.

Chua was awarded the Danny Floro Executive of the Year by the PBA Press Corps for the years 2018 and 2022.

References

Living people
Colegio de San Juan de Letran alumni
Filipino men's basketball coaches
Filipino men's basketball players
Filipino people of Chinese descent
UST Growling Tigers basketball players
Philippine Basketball Association broadcasters
Tanduay Rhum Masters coaches
1966 births
Pop Cola Panthers coaches
Sta. Lucia Realtors coaches
Barangay Ginebra San Miguel coaches